The fifth edition of La Course by Le Tour de France, a women's cycling race held in France, took place on 17 July 2018. The event was organised by ASO, which also organised the Tour de France. It was the 15th race of the 2018 UCI Women's World Tour.

Route and format 
The race returned to a single stage format in 2018, following the criticism of the 2017 edition's pursuit stage. This was welcomed by the peloton and media.

The race ran from Duingt, at the shores of Lake Annecy, to Le Grand Bornand, covering 118 km, and took in the Col de la Colombière. It was be held before stage 10 of the men's 2018 Tour de France, which also finished in Le Grand Bornand. The finale was identical to the men's stage. After the top of the 16.3 km long Col de la Colombière, 15 km was left to the finish.

Results 
The race finished in a finish of two Dutch cyclists with Annemiek van Vleuten beating 2015 race champion Anna van der Breggen to retain the trophy.

See also
 2018 in women's road cycling

References

External links
 
 

2018 UCI Women's World Tour
2018
2018 in French sport
La Course